The yellow-whiskered bush tanager or short-billed bush-tanager (Chlorospingus parvirostris) is a species of bird traditionally placed in the family Thraupidae, but now viewed closer to Arremonops in the Passerellidae. It is found in Bolivia, Colombia, Ecuador, and Peru.

Its natural habitat is subtropical or tropical moist montane forests.

References

yellow-whiskered bush tanager
Birds of the Northern Andes
yellow-whiskered bush tanager
Taxonomy articles created by Polbot